Hymaea is a genus of beetles in the family Phloeostichidae.

Species
These species belong to the genus Hymaea
 Hymaea parallela Carter, 1936
 Hymaea magna Sen Gupta & Crowson, 1966
 Hymaea succinifera Pascoe, 1869

References

Cucujoidea genera